The Cherepovets constituency (No.86) is a Russian legislative constituency in Vologda Oblast. The constituency covers western Vologda Oblast and the industrial city Cherepovets.

Members elected

Election results

1993

|-
! colspan=2 style="background-color:#E9E9E9;text-align:left;vertical-align:top;" |Candidate
! style="background-color:#E9E9E9;text-align:left;vertical-align:top;" |Party
! style="background-color:#E9E9E9;text-align:right;" |Votes
! style="background-color:#E9E9E9;text-align:right;" |%
|-
|style="background-color:"|
|align=left|Vasily Kovalyov
|align=left|Independent
|
|40.74%
|-
|style="background-color:"|
|align=left|Viktor Anufriyev
|align=left|Independent
| -
|20.94%
|-
| colspan="5" style="background-color:#E9E9E9;"|
|- style="font-weight:bold"
| colspan="3" style="text-align:left;" | Total
| 
| 100%
|-
| colspan="5" style="background-color:#E9E9E9;"|
|- style="font-weight:bold"
| colspan="4" |Source:
|
|}

1995

|-
! colspan=2 style="background-color:#E9E9E9;text-align:left;vertical-align:top;" |Candidate
! style="background-color:#E9E9E9;text-align:left;vertical-align:top;" |Party
! style="background-color:#E9E9E9;text-align:right;" |Votes
! style="background-color:#E9E9E9;text-align:right;" |%
|-
|style="background-color:"|
|align=left|Aleksandr Ponomaryov
|align=left|Communist Party
|
|20.79%
|-
|style="background-color:"|
|align=left|Viktor Anufriyev
|align=left|Independent
|
|19.60%
|-
|style="background-color:#1C1A0D"|
|align=left|Vasily Kovalyov (incumbent)
|align=left|Forward, Russia!
|
|17.51%
|-
|style="background-color:"|
|align=left|Vladimir Izotin
|align=left|Our Home – Russia
|
|9.33%
|-
|style="background-color:"|
|align=left|Igor Zhuravlev
|align=left|Independent
|
|7.18%
|-
|style="background-color:"|
|align=left|Vladimir Rogozhnikov
|align=left|Liberal Democratic Party
|
|6.91%
|-
|style="background-color:#FF8201"|
|align=left|Valentina Yasenchuk
|align=left|Christian-Democratic Union - Christians of Russia
|
|2.75%
|-
|style="background-color:#DA2021"|
|align=left|Mikhail Roshchin
|align=left|Ivan Rybkin Bloc
|
|2.68%
|-
|style="background-color:#000000"|
|colspan=2 |against all
|
|10.96%
|-
| colspan="5" style="background-color:#E9E9E9;"|
|- style="font-weight:bold"
| colspan="3" style="text-align:left;" | Total
| 
| 100%
|-
| colspan="5" style="background-color:#E9E9E9;"|
|- style="font-weight:bold"
| colspan="4" |Source:
|
|}

1999

|-
! colspan=2 style="background-color:#E9E9E9;text-align:left;vertical-align:top;" |Candidate
! style="background-color:#E9E9E9;text-align:left;vertical-align:top;" |Party
! style="background-color:#E9E9E9;text-align:right;" |Votes
! style="background-color:#E9E9E9;text-align:right;" |%
|-
|style="background-color:"|
|align=left|Aleksandr Orgolainen
|align=left|Independent
|
|35.69%
|-
|style="background-color:"|
|align=left|Aleksandr Ponomaryov (incumbent)
|align=left|Communist Party
|
|16.49%
|-
|style="background-color:#C21022"|
|align=left|Yevgeny Markov
|align=left|Party of Pensioners
|
|11.21%
|-
|style="background-color:"|
|align=left|Vyacheslav Ovchenkov
|align=left|Our Home – Russia
|
|8.52%
|-
|style="background-color:#084284"|
|align=left|Vladimir Burov
|align=left|Spiritual Heritage
|
|4.61%
|-
|style="background-color:"|
|align=left|Natalya Ocherenkova
|align=left|Independent
|
|4.21%
|-
|style="background-color:#1042A5"|
|align=left|Viktor Losev
|align=left|Union of Right Forces
|
|2.62%
|-
|style="background-color:#C62B55"|
|align=left|Andrey Okunev
|align=left|Peace, Labour, May
|
|1.91%
|-
|style="background-color:#000000"|
|colspan=2 |against all
|
|12.90%
|-
| colspan="5" style="background-color:#E9E9E9;"|
|- style="font-weight:bold"
| colspan="3" style="text-align:left;" | Total
| 
| 100%
|-
| colspan="5" style="background-color:#E9E9E9;"|
|- style="font-weight:bold"
| colspan="4" |Source:
|
|}

2003

|-
! colspan=2 style="background-color:#E9E9E9;text-align:left;vertical-align:top;" |Candidate
! style="background-color:#E9E9E9;text-align:left;vertical-align:top;" |Party
! style="background-color:#E9E9E9;text-align:right;" |Votes
! style="background-color:#E9E9E9;text-align:right;" |%
|-
|style="background-color:"|
|align=left|Aleksandr Orgolainen (incumbent)
|align=left|United Russia
|
|49.57%
|-
|style="background-color:"|
|align=left|Aleksandr Ponomaryov
|align=left|Communist Party
|
|15.62%
|-
|style="background-color:"|
|align=left|Lyudmila Sokova
|align=left|Liberal Democratic Party
|
|9.28%
|-
|style="background-color:"|
|align=left|Svetlana Kostereva
|align=left|Independent
|
|4.56%
|-
|style="background-color:#7C73CC"|
|align=left|Aleksey Vinogradov
|align=left|Great Russia – Eurasian Union
|
|2.59%
|-
|style="background-color:#164C8C"|
|align=left|Anatoly Fedotov-Lyubomirsky
|align=left|United Russian Party Rus'
|
|1.65%
|-
|style="background-color:#000000"|
|colspan=2 |against all
|
|14.79%
|-
| colspan="5" style="background-color:#E9E9E9;"|
|- style="font-weight:bold"
| colspan="3" style="text-align:left;" | Total
| 
| 100%
|-
| colspan="5" style="background-color:#E9E9E9;"|
|- style="font-weight:bold"
| colspan="4" |Source:
|
|}

2016

|-
! colspan=2 style="background-color:#E9E9E9;text-align:left;vertical-align:top;" |Candidate
! style="background-color:#E9E9E9;text-align:leftt;vertical-align:top;" |Party
! style="background-color:#E9E9E9;text-align:right;" |Votes
! style="background-color:#E9E9E9;text-align:right;" |%
|-
| style="background-color: " |
|align=left|Aleksey Kanayev
|align=left|United Russia
|
|42.90%
|-
|style="background-color:"|
|align=left|Aleksandr Morozov
|align=left|Communist Party
|
|14.44%
|-
|style="background-color:"|
|align=left|Ilya Gromov
|align=left|Liberal Democratic Party
|
|13.60%
|-
|style="background-color:"|
|align=left|Viktor Vavilov
|align=left|A Just Russia
|
|11.50%
|-
|style="background-color:"|
|align=left|Snezhana Goncharova
|align=left|The Greens
|
|2.78%
|-
|style="background-color:"|
|align=left|Nikolay Gorin
|align=left|Yabloko
|
|2.60%
|-
|style="background:"| 
|align=left|Aleksandr Protasov
|align=left|Communists of Russia
|
|2.37%
|-
|style="background:"| 
|align=left|Larisa Trubitsina
|align=left|People's Freedom Party
|
|2.15%
|-
|style="background-color:"|
|align=left|Sergey Katasonov
|align=left|Party of Growth
|
|2.14%
|-
|style="background-color:"|
|align=left|Nikolay Platonov
|align=left|Rodina
|
|1.91%
|-
| colspan="5" style="background-color:#E9E9E9;"|
|- style="font-weight:bold"
| colspan="3" style="text-align:left;" | Total
| 
| 100%
|-
| colspan="5" style="background-color:#E9E9E9;"|
|- style="font-weight:bold"
| colspan="4" |Source:
|
|}

2021

|-
! colspan=2 style="background-color:#E9E9E9;text-align:left;vertical-align:top;" |Candidate
! style="background-color:#E9E9E9;text-align:left;vertical-align:top;" |Party
! style="background-color:#E9E9E9;text-align:right;" |Votes
! style="background-color:#E9E9E9;text-align:right;" |%
|-
|style="background-color: " |
|align=left|Aleksey Kanayev (incumbent)
|align=left|United Russia
|
|37.68%
|-
|style="background-color:"|
|align=left|Aleksandr Morozov
|align=left|Communist Party
|
|26.54%
|-
|style="background-color:"|
|align=left|Olga Shirikova
|align=left|Liberal Democratic Party
|
|9.03%
|-
|style="background-color:"|
|align=left|Yury Yeregin
|align=left|A Just Russia — For Truth
|
|7.81%
|-
|style="background-color: "|
|align=left|Ivan Rytov
|align=left|New People
|
|6.97%
|-
|style="background-color: "|
|align=left|Igor Katukhin
|align=left|Party of Pensioners
|
|5.65%
|-
|style="background-color:"|
|align=left|Svetlana Voblikova
|align=left|Rodina
|
|3.04%
|-
| colspan="5" style="background-color:#E9E9E9;"|
|- style="font-weight:bold"
| colspan="3" style="text-align:left;" | Total
| 
| 100%
|-
| colspan="5" style="background-color:#E9E9E9;"|
|- style="font-weight:bold"
| colspan="4" |Source:
|
|}

Notes

References

Russian legislative constituencies
Politics of Vologda Oblast